Franz Schubert's compositions of 1814 are mostly in the Deutsch catalogue (D) range D 92–126, and include:
 Instrumental works:
 Symphony No. 2, D 125 (started December 1814)
 String Quartet No. 7, D 94
 Quartettsatz, D 103
 String Quartet No. 8, D 112
 Vocal music:
 Mass No. 1, D 105
 "Gretchen am Spinnrade", D 118
 "Sehnsucht", D 123

Table

Legend

List

|-
| data-sort-value="093" | 93
| data-sort-value="093" | 93
| data-sort-value="XXX,1894" | (1894)
| data-sort-value="2001,013" | XX, 1Nos.13–15
| data-sort-value="407,A1" | IV, 7Anh. No. 1
| Don Gayseros
| data-sort-value="text Don Gayseros" | 1. Don Gayseros,... wunderlicher, schöner Ritter – 2. Nächtens klang die süße Laute – 3. An dem jungen Morgenhimmel
| data-sort-value="1815-01-01" | 1815?
| data-sort-value="Text by Motte Fouque, Friedrich de la, Don Gayseros" | Text by Motte Fouqué, from Der Zauberring; Nos. 2 and 3 incomplete
|-
| data-sort-value="094" | 94
| data-sort-value="094" | 94
| data-sort-value="XXX,1871" | (1871)
| data-sort-value="0500,007" | V No. 7
| data-sort-value="603,02" | VI, 3 No. 2
| data-sort-value="String Quartet, D 094" | String Quartet No. 7
| data-sort-value="key D major" | D major
| data-sort-value="1811-01-01" | 1811 or1812?
| Allegro (partly reused in ) – Andante con moto – Minuet – Presto
|-
| data-sort-value="999.00941" |
| data-sort-value="094.1" | 94A
| data-sort-value="ZZZZ" |
| data-sort-value="ZZZZ" |
| data-sort-value="201,A7" | II, 1V, 6 No. 6
| data-sort-value="Orchestral piece, D 094A" | Orchestral piece, D 94A
| data-sort-value="key B-flat major" | B major
| data-sort-value="1814-01-01" | 
|-
| data-sort-value="999.00942" |
| data-sort-value="094.2" | 94B
| data-sort-value="ZZZZ" |
| data-sort-value="ZZZZ" |
| data-sort-value="609,00" | VI, 9
| data-sort-value="Minuets, 05, D 094B" | Five Minuets and Six German Dances, D 94B
| data-sort-value="ZZZZ" |
| data-sort-value="1814-01-01" | 1814
| For string quartet and two horns; Lost
|-
| data-sort-value="095" | 95
| data-sort-value="095" | 95
| data-sort-value="XXX,1848" | (1848)
| data-sort-value="2001,025" | XX, 1No. 25
| data-sort-value="407,01" | IV, 7No. 1
| Adelaide
| data-sort-value="text Einsam wandelt dein Freund" | Einsam wandelt dein Freund
| data-sort-value="1814-01-01" | 1814
| data-sort-value="Text by Matthisson, Friedrich von, Einsam wandelt dein Freund" | Text by Matthisson
|-
| data-sort-value="097" | 97
| data-sort-value="097" | 97
| data-sort-value="XXX,1894" | (1894)
| data-sort-value="2001,019" | XX, 1No. 19
| data-sort-value="407,01" | IV, 7No. 2
| Trost: An Elisa
| data-sort-value="text Lehnst du deine bleichgeharmte Wange" | Lehnst du deine bleichgehärmte Wange
| data-sort-value="1814-01-01" | 1814
| data-sort-value="Text by Matthisson, Friedrich von, Lehnst du deine bleichgeharmte Wange" | Text by Matthisson
|-
| data-sort-value="098" | 98
| data-sort-value="098" | 98
| data-sort-value="XXX,1894" | (1894)(1968)
| data-sort-value="2001,024" | XX, 1No. 24
| data-sort-value="407,01" | IV, 7 No. 3Anh. No. 2
| data-sort-value="Erinnerungen, D 098" | Erinnerungen, D 98
| data-sort-value="text Am Seegestad, in lauen Vollmondsnachten 1" | Am Seegestad, in lauen Vollmondsnächten
| data-sort-value="1814-09-21" | fall 1814
| data-sort-value="Text by Matthisson, Friedrich von, Am Seegestad, in lauen Vollmondsnachten 1" | Text by Matthisson; Two versions: 1st is fragment, 2nd in AGA
|-
| data-sort-value="099" | 99
| data-sort-value="099" | 99
| data-sort-value="XXX,1894" | (1894)
| data-sort-value="2001,016" | XX, 1No. 16
| data-sort-value="407,04" | IV, 7 No. 4
| data-sort-value="Andenken, D 099" | Andenken, D 99
| data-sort-value="text Ich denke dein wenn durch den Hain 1" | Ich denke dein wenn durch den Hain
| data-sort-value="1814-04-01" | April 1814
| data-sort-value="Text by Matthisson, Friedrich von, Ich denke dein wenn durch den Hain 1" | Text by Matthisson
|-
| 100
| 100
| data-sort-value="XXX,1894" | (1894)
| data-sort-value="2001,017" | XX, 1No. 17
| data-sort-value="407,05" | IV, 7 No. 5
| data-sort-value="Geisternahe" | Geisternähe
| data-sort-value="text Der Damm’rung Schein durchblinkt den Hain" | Der Dämm’rung Schein durchblinkt den Hain
| data-sort-value="1814-04-01" | April 1814
| data-sort-value="Text by Matthisson, Friedrich von, Der Damm’rung Schein durchblinkt den Hain" | Text by Matthisson
|-
| 101
| 101
| data-sort-value="XXX,1894" | (1894)
| data-sort-value="2001,018" | XX, 1No. 18
| data-sort-value="407,06" | IV, 7 No. 6
| Erinnerung, D 101, a.k.a. Todtenopfer
| data-sort-value="text Kein Rosenschimmer leuchtet" | Kein Rosenschimmer leuchtet
| data-sort-value="1814-04-01" | April 1814
| data-sort-value="Text by Matthisson, Friedrich von, Kein Rosenschimmer leuchtet" | Text by Matthisson
|-
| 102
| 102
| data-sort-value="XXX,1840" | (1840)
| data-sort-value="2001,020" | XX, 1No. 20
| data-sort-value="407,07" | IV, 7 No. 7
| data-sort-value="Betende, Die" | Die Betende
| data-sort-value="text Laura betet!" | Laura betet!
| data-sort-value="1814-09-21" | fall 1814
| data-sort-value="Text by Matthisson, Friedrich von, Laura betet!" | Text by Matthisson; Partly reused in 
|-
| 103
| 103
| data-sort-value="XXX,1939" | (1939)
| data-sort-value="ZZZZ" |
| data-sort-value="604,A3" | VI, 4 Anh. No. 3
| Quartettsatz, D 103
| data-sort-value="key C minor" | C minor
| data-sort-value="1814-04-23" | 23/4/1814
| Grave, Allegro (fragment); Completed by Alfred Orel in 1st ed.
|-
| 104
| 104
| data-sort-value="XXX,1895" | (1895)
| data-sort-value="2010,584" | XX, 10No. 584
| data-sort-value="407,08" | IV, 7 No. 8 &Anh. No. 3
| data-sort-value="Befreier Europas in Paris, Die" | Die Befreier Europas in Paris
| data-sort-value="text Sie sind in Paris!" | Sie sind in Paris!
| data-sort-value="1814-05-16" | 16/5/1814
| data-sort-value="Text by Mikan, Johann Christian Mikan, Sie sind in Paris!" | Text by Mikan; Two drafts and a final version
|-
| data-sort-value="105" | 105185
| 105
| data-sort-value="XXX,1856" | (1856)
| data-sort-value="1301,001" | XIII, 1No. 1
| data-sort-value="101,0a" | I, 1a
| Mass No. 1
| data-sort-value="key F major" | F majorKyrie – Gloria – Credo – Sanctus & Benedictus – Agnus Dei
| data-sort-value="1814-07-22" | 17/5/1814–22/7/1814
|-
| 106
| 106
| data-sort-value="XXX,1888" | (1888)
| data-sort-value="1400,009" | XIV No. 9
| data-sort-value="108,00" | I, 8
| data-sort-value="Salve Regina, D 106" | Salve Regina, D 106
| data-sort-value="key B-flat major" | B majorSalve Regina
| data-sort-value="1814-07-01" | 28/6/1814–1/7/1814
| data-sort-value="Text: Salve Regina 2" | Text: Salve Regina (other settings: , 223, 386, 676 and 811); For t and orchestra
|-
| 107
| 107
| data-sort-value="XXX,1894" | (1894)(1968)
| data-sort-value="2001,021" | XX, 1No. 21
| data-sort-value="407,09" | IV, 7 No. 9
| Lied aus der Ferne
| data-sort-value="text Wenn in des Abends letztem Scheine" | Wenn in des Abends letztem Scheine
| data-sort-value="1814-07-01" | July 1814
| data-sort-value="Text by Matthisson, Friedrich von, Wenn in des Abends letztem Scheine" | Text by Matthisson; Two versions: 1st in AGA
|-
| 108
| 108
| data-sort-value="XXX,1894" | (1894)
| data-sort-value="2001,022" | XX, 1No. 22
| data-sort-value="407,10" | IV, 7 No. 10
| data-sort-value="Abend, Der, D 108" | Der Abend, D 108
| data-sort-value="text Purpur malt die Tannenhugel" | Purpur malt die Tannenhügel
| data-sort-value="1814-07-01" | July 1814
| data-sort-value="Text by Matthisson, Friedrich von, Purpur malt die Tannenhugel" | Text by Matthisson
|-
| 109
| 109
| data-sort-value="XXX,1894" | (1894)
| data-sort-value="2001,023" | XX, 1No. 23
| data-sort-value="407,11" | IV, 7 No. 11
| Lied der Liebe
| data-sort-value="text Durch Fichten am Hugel" | Durch Fichten am Hügel
| data-sort-value="1814-07-01" | July 1814
| data-sort-value="Text by Matthisson, Friedrich von, Durch Fichten am Hugel" | Text by Matthisson
|-
| 110
| 110
| data-sort-value="XXX,1891" | (1891)
| data-sort-value="1600,043" | XVINo. 43
| data-sort-value="301,00" | III, 1
| data-sort-value="Wer ist gross?" | Wer ist groß?
| data-sort-value="text Wer ist wohl gross?" | Wer ist wohl groß?
| data-sort-value="1814-07-25" | 24/7/1814–25/7/1814
| For bTTBB and orchestra
|-
| 111
| data-sort-value="999.0077" | 77
| data-sort-value="ZZZZ" |

| data-sort-value="ZZZZ" |

| data-sort-value="ZZZZ" |

| data-sort-value="ZZZZ" |

| data-sort-value="ZZZZ" |

| data-sort-value="ZZZZ" |

| See 
|-
| data-sort-value="999.01111" |
| data-sort-value="111.1" | 111A
| data-sort-value="ZZZZ" |
| data-sort-value="ZZZZ" |
| data-sort-value="606,A1" | VI, 6 Anh. No. 1
| String Trio, D 111A
| data-sort-value="key B-flat major" | B major
| data-sort-value="1814-09-13" | 5/9/1814–13/9/1814
| Allegro (fragment); early version of 
|-
| 112
| 112
| data-sort-value="168,1863" | 168p(1863)
| data-sort-value="0500,008" | V No. 8
| data-sort-value="604,10" | VI, 4No. 10
| data-sort-value="String Quartet, D 112" | String Quartet No. 8
| data-sort-value="key B-flat major" | B major
| data-sort-value="1814-09-13" | 5/9/1814–13/9/1814
| Allegro ma non troppo – Andante sostenuto – Minuet – Presto; Based on 
|-
| 113
| 113
| data-sort-value="058,1821-2" | 58,2(1821)(1826)(1894)
| data-sort-value="2001,026" | XX, 1No. 26
| data-sort-value="403,00" | IV, 3
| An Emma
| data-sort-value="text Weit in nebelgrauer Ferne" | Weit in nebelgrauer Ferne
| data-sort-value="1814-09-17" | 17/9/1814
| data-sort-value="Text by Schiller, Friedrich, Weit in nebelgrauer Ferne" | Text by Schiller; Three versions: 2nd publ. in 1821 – 3rd is Op. 58 No. 2
|-
| 114
| 114
| data-sort-value="XXX,1868" | (1868)(1901)
| data-sort-value="2001,027" | XX, 1No. 27
| data-sort-value="407,12" | IV, 7 No. 12 &Anh. No. 4
| Romanze, D 114
| data-sort-value="text Ein Fraulein klagt' im finstern Turm" | Ein Fräulein klagt' im finstern Turm
| data-sort-value="1814-09-01" | September1814
| data-sort-value="Text by Matthisson, Friedrich von, Ein Fraulein klagt' im finstern Turm" | Text by Matthisson; Two versions: 2nd in AGA
|-
| 115
| 115
| data-sort-value="XXX,1840" | (1840)
| data-sort-value="2001,028" | XX, 1No. 28
| data-sort-value="407,13" | IV, 7 No. 13
| data-sort-value="An Laura, als sie Klopstocks Auferstehungslied sang" | An Laura, als sie Klopstocks Auferstehungslied sang
| data-sort-value="text Herzen, die gen Himmel sich erheben" | Herzen, die gen Himmel sich erheben
| data-sort-value="1814-10-07" | 2/10/1814–7/10/1814
| data-sort-value="Text by Matthisson, Friedrich von, Herzen, die gen Himmel sich erheben" | Text by Matthisson
|-
| 116
| 116
| data-sort-value="XXX,1840" | (1840)
| data-sort-value="2001,029" | XX, 1No. 29
| data-sort-value="407,14" | IV, 7 No. 14
| data-sort-value="Geistertanz, Der, D 116" | Der Geistertanz, D 116
| data-sort-value="text Die bretterne Kammer der Toten erbebt 3" | Die bretterne Kammer der Toten erbebt
| data-sort-value="1814-10-14" | 14/10/1814
| data-sort-value="Text by Matthisson, Friedrich von, Die bretterne Kammer der Toten erbebt 3" | Text by Matthisson (other settings: , 15A and 494)
|-
| 117
| 117
| data-sort-value="XXX,1894" | (1894)
| data-sort-value="2001,030" | XX, 1No. 30
| data-sort-value="408,45" | IV, 8No. 45
| data-sort-value="Madchen aus der Fremde, Das, D 117" | Das Mädchen aus der Fremde, D 117
| data-sort-value="text In einem Tal bei armen Hirten 1" | In einem Tal bei armen Hirten
| data-sort-value="1814-10-16" | 16/10/1814
| data-sort-value="Text by Schiller, Friedrich, In einem Tal bei armen Hirten 1" | Text by Schiller
|-
| 118
| 118
| data-sort-value="002,1821-0" | 2(1821)
| data-sort-value="2001,031" | XX, 1No. 31
| data-sort-value="401,0020" | IV, 1a
| Gretchen am Spinnrade
| data-sort-value="text Meine Ruh' ist hin" | Meine Ruh' ist hin
| data-sort-value="1814-10-19" | 19/10/1814
| data-sort-value="Text by Goethe, Johann Wolfgang von from Faust I, 15 Meine Ruh ist hin" | Text by Goethe, from Faust I, 15
|-
| 119
| 119
| data-sort-value="XXX,1850" | (1850)
| data-sort-value="2001,032" | XX, 1No. 32
| data-sort-value="407,15" | IV, 7 No. 15
| Nachtgesang, D 119
| data-sort-value="text O! gib vom weichen Pfuhle" | O! gib vom weichen Pfühle
| data-sort-value="1814-11-30" | 30/11/1814
| data-sort-value="Text by Goethe, Johann Wolfgang von, O gib vom weichen Pfuhle" | Text by Goethe
|-
| 120
| 120
| data-sort-value="XXX,1835" | (1835)
| data-sort-value="2001,033" | XX, 1No. 33
| data-sort-value="407,16" | IV, 7 No. 16
| data-sort-value="Trost in Tranen" | Trost in Tränen
| data-sort-value="text Wie kommt's, dass du so traurig bist" | Wie kommt's, daß du so traurig bist
| data-sort-value="1814-11-30" | 30/11/1814
| data-sort-value="Text by Goethe, Johann Wolfgang von, Wie kommt's dass du so traurig bist" | Text by Goethe
|-
| 121
| 121
| data-sort-value="003,1821-1" | 3,1(1821)(1894)
| data-sort-value="2001,034" | XX, 1No. 34
| data-sort-value="401,0031" | IV, 1a &b No. 2
| data-sort-value="Schafers Klagelied" | Schäfers Klagelied
| data-sort-value="text Da droben auf jenem Berge" | Da droben auf jenem Berge
| data-sort-value="1819-02-28" | 30/11/1814–28/2/1819?
| data-sort-value="Text by Goethe, Johann Wolfgang von, Da droben auf jenem Berge" | Text by Goethe; Two versions: 1st is Op. 3 No. 1 – 2nd composed for 28/2/1819?
|-
| 122
| 122
| data-sort-value="XXX,1872" | (1872)
| data-sort-value="2001,038" | XX, 1No. 38
| data-sort-value="407,17" | IV, 7 No. 17
| Ammenlied
| data-sort-value="text Am hohen, hohen Turm" | Am hohen, hohen Turm
| data-sort-value="1814-12-01" | early Dec.1814
| data-sort-value="Text by Lubi, Michael, Am hohen, hohen Turm" | Text by 
|-
| 123
| 123
| data-sort-value="XXX,1842" | (1842)
| data-sort-value="2001,035" | XX, 1No. 35
| data-sort-value="407,18" | IV, 7 No. 18
| data-sort-value="Sehnsucht, D 123" | Sehnsucht, D 123
| data-sort-value="text Was zieht mir das Herz so?" | Was zieht mir das Herz so?
| data-sort-value="1814-12-03" | 3/12/1814
| data-sort-value="Text by Goethe, Johann Wolfgang von, Was zieht mir das Herz so" | Text by Goethe
|-
| 124
| 124
| data-sort-value="XXX,1885" | (1885)(1894)(1968)
| data-sort-value="2001,036" | XX, 1No. 36
| data-sort-value="407,19" | IV, 7 No. 19 &Anh. No. 7
| Am See, D 124
| data-sort-value="text Sitz' ich im Gras am glatten See" | Sitz' ich im Gras am glatten See
| data-sort-value="1814-12-07" | 3/12/1814–7/12/1814
| data-sort-value="Text by Mayrhofer, Johann, Sitz' ich im Gras am glatten See" | Text by Mayrhofer; Two versions: 1st is fragment – 2nd, modified in 1885 publ., in AGA
|-
| 125
| 125
| data-sort-value="XXX,1884" | (1884)
| data-sort-value="0101,002" | I, 1No. 2
| data-sort-value="501,02" | V, 1 No. 2
| data-sort-value="Symphony No. 02" | Symphony No. 2
| data-sort-value="key B-flat major" | B major
| data-sort-value="1815-03-24" | 10/12/1814–24/3/1815
| Largo, Allegro vivace – Andante – Minuet – Presto vivace
|-
| 126
| 126
| data-sort-value="XXX,1832" | (1832)(1873)
| data-sort-value="2001,037" | XX, 1No. 37
| data-sort-value="407,20" | IV, 7 No. 20 &Anh. No. 8
| Scene from Faust
| data-sort-value="text Wie anders, Gretchen, war dir's" | Wie anders, Gretchen, war dir's
| data-sort-value="1814-12-12" | early Dec.–12/12/1814
| data-sort-value="Text by Goethe, Johann Wolfgang von from Faust I, 20" | Text by Goethe, from Faust I, 20; Two versions: 2nd, publ. in 1832, in AGA
|}

Lists of compositions by Franz Schubert
Compositions by Franz Schubert
Schubert